Stuart Parker (born 1972) is a Canadian politician who was the acting leader of the BC Ecosocialists party in 2020 and was the leader of the Green Party in British Columbia, Canada, from 1993 to 2000. In 2009, during the Ontario by-election to replace MPP Michael Bryant, he unsuccessfully sought the Ontario New Democratic Party nomination for the St. Paul's provincial riding.

Green Party activism
Prior to winning the party's leadership at the age of 21, he had been the founder and spokesperson of the party's youth wing, the Young Greens from 1988 to 1992 and was best known for coordinating the group's successful national campaign against McDonald's Restaurants' use of ozone-destroying foam packaging. Parker and the Young Greens received substantial credit from Canada's national media in 1990 when the restaurant giant abandoned the use of chlorofluorocarbon-based foam. The group's continued campaign against the use of CFCs in foam packaging led to CKF Incorporated, Canada's largest manufacturer of CFC-based foam, abandoning the use of CFCs in manufacturing in 1993.

Parker managed to take the party from a tiny group of 59 in 1992 to a party that was only four candidates short of a full slate in the 1996 provincial election. He built links to poverty activists and labour groups. During his leadership, the party's standing in public opinion polls rose from 1% to 11%. During his time as the party leader, Parker was arrested in anti-clearcutting blockades in Clayoquot Sound in 1993 and the Slocan Valley in 1997.

Reversing his earlier position, he negotiated agreements with the municipal affiliates of the then-incumbent British Columbia New Democratic Party (NDP) provincial government and the labour councils of Vancouver and Victoria in 1998 and 1999, resulting in the first and the only Red-Green coalitions in Canadian history in BC's 1999 municipal elections. As part of these coalitions, the Greens won their first-ever municipal seats in Canadian cities.

Ultimately, his focus on building a broadly left-wing green party in BC brought criticism from some members of the environmental movement in the province. Those people played a significant role in the efforts that eventually led to Parker's defeat at the party's March 2000 convention - after previous unsuccessful attempts to unseat him in 1998 and 1999.

At the time of Parker's defeat, his supporters in the party were in negotiations with the NDP over a potential provincial electoral alliance. His successor, Adriane Carr, cancelled these negotiations.

On June 2, 2020, Parker rejoined the party and endorsed Dimitri Lascaris in the leadership election.

Parker is a founder of the BC Ecosocialist and was its acting leader, as well as a prospective candidate in the 2020 British Columbia general election. He resigned as both after allegations he made transphobic comments.

BC Ecosocialists

BC Ecosocialists was  a provincial political party in British Columbia, Canada. Its stated aims included steering the province to a greener society and fighting discrimination against the First Nations and immigrants.  Formed in 2019, the 2020 British Columbia general election was expected to be its first.

Shortly after the 2020 provincial election was called, Parker resigned following allegations of transphobia. Parker dismissed the allegations as "a blizzard of cancel culture silliness", but resigned as party leader on September 22, 2020, leaving the position vacant. The party did not field any candidates in the election.

Policy 
The party described itself as "Further left than the NDP, greener than the greens". It listed figures Greta Thunberg, Alexandria Ocasio-Cortez, and Autumn Peltier as their inspirations, among others. It supported the water protector activists at Standing Rock Indian Reservation, particularly praising these people prioritizing the Earth and its inhabitants over wealth.

The party's main priority was to provide a better quality of living for all people, including housing for all, food for all, and creating a sustainable environment. It proposed the adoption of a Green New Deal to create jobs by developing green energy sources in British Columbia (BC). The party planned to increase taxes for top earning individuals and corporations in order to fund such projects, as well as make improvements to the transportation infrastructure. It also wanted to freeze fossil fuel development in the province.

The Ecosocialists promised to break up large cooperative institutions into small, community based cooperatives. Their main targets were Vancity and the Mountain Equipment Co-op. They also planned to raise the minimum wage to $16 per hour, criticizing John Horgan's plan to keep the minimum wage below Alberta's until 2021.

The party also aimed to improve human rights of minority groups in BC, particularly the First Nations in British Columbia, the LGBT+ community, and persons with disabilities, and put an end to gender inequality. The party had a decolonization policy, described as "returning power, land and resources to Indigenous people, not just tearful apologies and photo-ops".

The party planned to provide further resources to fight white collar crime, with emphasis on those who break workers' safety and wage laws, as well as pollution. It aimed to decriminalize drug usage, and instead focus on rehabilitation for addicts. It would also file suit against the oil and coal industries for their roles in climate change.

The party wanted to shift to a proportional representation system of voting based on the Norwegian system. Furthermore, the party wanted to increase aboriginal representation in the legislature by adopting the New Zealand model, which includes Māori electorates, and make election day a statutory holiday to improve voter turnout.

NDP and electoral reform activism
Parker's departure from the party came as the Greens were perceived to be moving to the political right. He subsequently worked with the NDP in the 2001 provincial election and with the federal New Democratic Party in the 2004 federal election.

Upon leaving the Green Party, Parker initially worked as a lobbyist for Mike Geoghegan.  Despite leaving the Greens and joining the NDP, he remained a strong advocate for electoral reform, specifically proportional representation. A co-founder of the BC Electoral Change Coalition in 1997, he served on the board of Fair Voting BC (2000–2002, 2006–2009) and on the board of Fair Vote Canada (2005–2007). He served as a spokesperson for the "YES" campaign in the 2005 and 2009 BC referendums on voting reform.

Living in Ontario in 2009, he sought the NDP nomination for the provincial by-election in the St. Paul's electoral district, but was defeated by lawyer Julian Heller.

Following the defeat, Parker was encouraged by the NDP's national office and the board of the St. Paul's federal riding association to seek the party's federal nomination. However, in March 2010, after initially being approved by the party's vetting process the previous November, he was informed by head office staff that he was not only disqualified from running in St. Paul's, but barred from running for a federal NDP nomination anywhere in Canada.  Party officials objected to four posts he had made to his personal Facebook page in the intervening months, particularly one in which he urged Toronto NDP supporters to back the NDP candidate for mayor in the wake of a sex scandal.

In March 2018, Stuart Parker resigned from the NDP over the provincial government's subsidies to transnational fossil fuel producers.

Surrey municipal politics

Parker organizes reading groups through the Los Altos Institute, which describes itself as a "left-wing think tank", and Los Altos began a reading group in Surrey, BC in 2016.
From that Surrey group, in April 2018, Parker announced the creation of a civic party in the city of Surrey called Proudly Surrey.  The party ran candidates for City Council, including Parker, a candidate for mayor, Dr. Pauline Greaves, and candidates for Surrey School Board in the October 20, 2018, municipal election.

Personal

The nephew of Harry Jerome, Parker was the first leader of a registered political party in BC of African descent and gave the keynote speech to the opening ceremony of the province's Black History Month in 1994.

He is currently based in the Vancouver area after doing a travel-intensive postdoctoral fellowship from the Social Sciences and Humanities Research Council of Canada on the religions of indigenous peoples of the Americas and Polynesia. He works as a university lecturer at both Simon Fraser University and the British Columbia Institute of Technology.

Election results

1. Vancouver Parks Board is chosen in a citywide (at-large) election in which seven candidates are elected. Although Parker received 3.2% of the total votes, approximately 23% of electors voted for him.

References

External links
Official website

Notes

1972 births
Politicians from Vancouver
Parker,Stuart
Leaders of the Green Party of British Columbia
Living people
British Columbia political party leaders
Black Canadian politicians
Green Party of British Columbia candidates in British Columbia provincial elections